Mihove is a village in Vyzhnytsia Raion, Chernivtsi Oblast, Ukraine. It belongs to Berehomet settlement hromada, one of the hromadas of Ukraine.

References

Villages in Vyzhnytsia Raion